The 2011 Men's Oceania Cup was the seventh edition of the men's field hockey tournament. It was held from 6–9 October 2011 in Hobart.

The tournament served as a qualifier for the 2012 Summer Olympics.

Australia won the tournament for the seventh time, defeating New Zealand in the three–game series by goal difference, after the teams finished equal on points. Despite the Black Sticks' second place finish, the 2011 Oceania Cup held two qualifying allocations for the Olympic Games, meaning both teams qualified.

Results
All times are local (AEDT).

Pool

Fixtures

Statistics

Final standings

Goalscorers

References

External links
Official website

2011 Oceania Cup
2011 in field hockey
2011 in Australian field hockey
2011 in New Zealand sport
2011 Oceania Cup
Field hockey qualification for the 2012 Summer Olympics
2011 Oceania Cup
October 2011 sports events in Australia